Les Éplatures Airport  is a small international airport near La Chaux-de-Fonds, Switzerland.  The airport primarily caters to executive and recreational flying, with some air taxi and charter service.

History 
The first plane landed at the field in 1912, but the airport concession was not obtained until 1955.  At the end of World War II, Swiss authorities identified existing locations that were to be modernized as regional airports, a second tier of infrastructure to support the primary urban airports, with Les Eplatures being one of the five.

Facilities

Airlines and destinations
The following airlines operate regular scheduled and charter flights at Les Eplatures Airport:

References

External links
 Official website
 
 

Airports in Switzerland